The Cherpu Assembly Constituency  of Kerala Legislative Assembly.

Members of the Legislative Assembly

References

External links
 

Former assembly constituencies of Kerala